Jeanderson Salvador Pereira (born August 13, 1991) is a Brazilian footballer who plays for Nova Iguaçu FC.

Career
After spending his career in his native Brazil, Jeanderson signed with MLS club Portland Timbers on December 8, 2014.

On December 7, 2015, Jeanderson's contract was declined with the Portland Timbers.

Honours

Club
Portland Timbers
MLS Cup: 2015
Western Conference (playoffs): 2015

References

External links
MLS player profile
Jeanderson at ZeroZero

1991 births
Living people
Sportspeople from Espírito Santo
Brazilian footballers
Brazilian expatriate footballers
Rio Branco Football Club players
Esporte Clube São José players
Esporte Clube Cruzeiro players
Portland Timbers players
Portland Timbers 2 players
Clube Náutico Capibaribe players
Bonsucesso Futebol Clube players
Cuiabá Esporte Clube players
Agremiação Sportiva Arapiraquense players
Resende Futebol Clube players
Clube Atlético Tubarão players
Sampaio Corrêa Futebol e Esporte players
Nova Iguaçu Futebol Clube players
Vitória Futebol Clube (ES) players
Estrela do Norte Futebol Clube players
Associação Desportiva Cabofriense players
Clube Sociedade Esportiva players
Major League Soccer players
USL Championship players
Campeonato Brasileiro Série B players
Campeonato Brasileiro Série D players
Association football defenders
Brazilian expatriate sportspeople in the United States
Expatriate soccer players in the United States